Syarikat Air Negeri Sembilan Sdn Bhd, (literally meaning Negeri Sembilan Water Company Private Limited, abbreviated as SAINS), formerly known as Negeri Sembilan Water Supply Department (abbreviated as JBANS) and Syarikat Air Negeri Sembilan Berhad (Negeri Sembilan Water Company Limited) is a government-linked company responsible for water supply services in the state of Negeri Sembilan.

External links
SAINS website

2008 establishments in Malaysia
Negeri Sembilan
Water companies of Malaysia
Government-owned companies of Malaysia
Privately held companies of Malaysia
Malaysian companies established in 2008
Public utilities established in 2008